Fifth seed Pierre-Hugues Herbert won the title, beating Marsel İlhan in the final 6–2, 6–3.

Seeds

Draw

Finals

Top half

Bottom half

References
 Main Draw
 Qualifying Draw

2014 ATP Challenger Tour
2014 Singles